Bermuda competed at the 2019 Parapan American Games held from August 23 to September 1, 2019, in Lima, Peru. In total, athletes representing Bermuda won two gold medals and one silver medal. All medals were won in athletics by Jessica Cooper Lewis. The country finished in 13th place in the medal table.

Medalists

Athletics 

Jessica Cooper Lewis won the gold medals in women's 100 metres T53 and women's 400 metres T53 events.

She won the silver medal in the women's 800 metres T53 event.

Boccia 

Athletes representing Bermuda competed in the individual BC1 and individual BC4 events.

References 

Nations at the 2019 Parapan American Games
2019 in Bermudian sport